Eutheria (from Greek ,  'good, right' and ,  'beast') is the clade consisting of all therian mammals that are more closely related to placentals than to marsupials.

Eutherians are distinguished from noneutherians by various phenotypic traits of the feet, ankles, jaws and teeth. All extant eutherians lack epipubic bones, which are present in all other living mammals (marsupials and monotremes). This allows for expansion of the abdomen during pregnancy.

Eutheria was named in 1872 by Theodore Gill; in 1880 Thomas Henry Huxley defined it to encompass a more broadly defined group than Placentalia.

Characteristics 

Distinguishing features are:
an enlarged malleolus ("little hammer") at the bottom of the tibia, the larger of the two shin bones
the joint between the first metatarsal bone and the entocuneiform bone (the innermost of the three cuneiform bones) in the foot is offset farther back than the joint between the second metatarsal and middle cuneiform bones—in metatherians these joints are level with each other
various features of jaws and teeth

Subgroups
 Infraclass: Placentalia
 Clade: †Tamirtheria
 Order: †Asioryctitheria
 Order: †Cimolesta
 Order: †Leptictida
 Family: †Zalambdalestidae
 Family: †Adapisoriculidae
 Family: †Didymoconidae
 Family: †Zhelestidae
 Genus: †Acristatherium
 Genus: †Ambolestes
 Genus: †Bobolestes
 Genus: †Cokotherium
 Genus: †Durlstodon
 Genus: †Durlstotherium
 Genus: †Endotherium
 Genus: †Eomaia?
 Genus: †Juramaia
 Genus: †Montanalestes
 Genus: †Murtoilestes
 Genus: †Sinodelphys?

Evolutionary history
Eutheria contains several extinct genera as well as larger groups, many with complicated taxonomic histories still not fully understood. Members of the Adapisoriculidae, Cimolesta and Leptictida have been previously placed within the outdated placental group Insectivora, while Zhelestids have been considered primitive ungulates. However, more recent studies have suggested these enigmatic taxa represent stem group eutherians, more basal to Placentalia.

The weakly favoured cladogram favours Boreoeuthearia as a basal eutherian clade as sister to the Atlantogenata.

References

 
Mammal taxonomy
Oxfordian first appearances
Extant Late Jurassic first appearances
Taxa described in 1872